Duan Jianyu (段建宇, born 1970, Zhengzhou, Henan Province) is a prominent contemporary visual artist from China and writer. The artist is primarily known for her surrealist-style of paintings that draw from a range of art histories, including European-American modernism, Chinese ink painting, and Chinese Socialist Realism.

Education and Career 
She graduated from the Guangzhou Academy of Fine Arts in 1995. She currently teaches at the Fine Arts Department of South China Normal University in Guangzhou.

Style and Themes 
The style of Duan Jianyu’s paintings tend to start out with objects or people observed in everyday reality and then appear to fade out and slip slowly into the world of the mind. This kind of narrative technique appears consistently in the artist’s creations. Duan’s large-scale paintings present incongruous scenarios drawing on a wide range of sources from European art history, classical Chinese painting, and imagery of traditional rural life. Diverse elements—such as European nudes, Chinese landscapes, chickens, watermelons, and air hostesses—come together to explore with wry humor the clashes between urban and rural, tradition and modernity in a society undergoing enormous changes during a period of China's economic reforms and globalization. 

She has also created multi-media installations, artist’s books, photographs, and ink paintings on cardboard.

Similarly Duan's writings draw on a mixture of characters and events taken from rural life in China and references to international, post-consumerist culture.

Selected works 
Duan's most well-known installation work is titled Artistic Chicken (2002), which she originally created for the "Canton Express" exhibition curated by Hou Hanru in 2003 for the "Zone of Urgency (Z.O.U)" project within the 50th Venice Biennale in 2003. Artistic Chicken comprised 100 hand-painted, realistic-looking sculptures of chickens that were installed together on the floor of the gallery. The work was re-installed at the M+ Pavilion in Hong Kong in a re-staging of the "Canton Express" exhibition in 2017, although fewer than half of the original chicken-sculptures had survived.

Exhibitions 
Duan Jianyu's artworks have been featured in many exhibitions in China, Asia, and internationally. 

Her solo exhibitions include: "Automatic Writing – Automatic Understanding," Pond Society (New Century Art Foundation), Shanghai, 2020; "Sharp, Sharp, Smart," at Mirrored Gardens, Guangzhou, 2016; and two-person exhibitions, "A Potent Force: Duan Jianyu and Hu Xiaoyuan," at the Rockbund Art Museum, Shanghai, 2013; and with Li Tianyuan, at China Art Archives & Warehouse, Beijing, in 1999.

She has participated in numerous group exhibitions including: "One Hand Clapping," Solomon R. Guggenheim Museum, New York, 2018; "Times Heterotopia Trilogy III: The Man Who Never Threw Anything Away," Times Museum, Guangzhou, 2017; "Canton Express: Art from the Pearl River Delta," M+ Pavilion, Hong Kong, 2017; the 8th Asia Pacific Triennial of Contemporary Art, Queensland Art Gallery | Gallery of Modern Art, Brisbane, Australia, 2015–16; “15 Years Chinese Contemporary Art Award,” Power Station of Art, Shanghai, 2014; “Dai hanzhi, 5000 artists,” UCCA, Beijing, 2014; “A Potent Force: Duan Jianyu and Hu Xiaoyuan”, Rockbund Art Museum, 2013; “Ink Art: Past as Present in Contemporary China,” The Metropolitan Museum of Art, New York, 2013; “Face,” Mingsheng Art Museum, Shanghai, 2012; “Nostalgia East Asia Contemporary Art Exhibition,” Korea Foundation, 2011; “China China China!,” Sainsbury Centre For Visual Arts, 2009; the 3rd Guangzhou Triennial “Farewell to Post-Colonialism,” Guangdong Museum of Art, Guangzhou, 2008; “China Welcomes You… Desires, Struggles, New Identities,” Kunsthaus Graz, 2007; “Octomania,” Para Site art space, Hong Kong, 2006; the 50th Venice Biennale, 2003; the 4th Gwangju Biennale, 2002; "Human Landscape," at China Art Archives & Warehouse, Beijing, 2001.

Awards 
Duan Jianyu is the winner of Chinese Contemporary Art Awards 2010, Best Artist.

Collections 
M+, Hong Kong

Solomon R. Guggenheim Museum, New York

References

Living people
1970 births